The Hefty–Blum Farmstead is located in Washington, Green County, Wisconsin.

History
Fridolin Hefty was an immigrant from Switzerland. He first began operating his farm in 1848. Over the course of decades, several buildings were constructed on the site. It was added to the State and the National Register of Historic Places in 2000. The farmstead is also known as Meadowbrook Dairy Farm.

Hefty's grandson, Fred K. Hefty, was a member of the Wisconsin State Assembly.

References

Farms on the National Register of Historic Places in Wisconsin
National Register of Historic Places in Green County, Wisconsin
Dairy buildings in the United States
Victorian architecture in Wisconsin